(1158–1185) was one of the sons of Taira no Kiyomori, and one of the Taira Clan's chief commanders during the Heian period of the 12th century of Japan. Following the Battle of Uji in 1180, Shigehira fought in the Siege of Nara, where he burned the monks of the Tōdai-ji monastery.

He married Fujiwara no Hoshi (藤原輔子), the second daughter of Dainagon Fujiwara Kunitsuna (藤原邦綱).  

Shigehira defeated Minamoto no Yukiie at the Battle of Sunomatagawa in 1181.

He was captured in 1184 at the Battle of Ichi-no-Tani. He was then turned over to the monks of the Tōdai-ji monastery in 1185, and was killed as revenge.

References

 Turnbull, Stephen (1998). The Samurai Sourcebook. London: Cassell & Co.

1158 births
1185 deaths
Taira clan
People of Heian-period Japan
People of the Genpei War